Sissinghurst is a small village in the borough of Tunbridge Wells in Kent, England. Originally called Milkhouse Street (also referred to as Mylkehouse), Sissinghurst changed its name in the 1850s, possibly to avoid association with the smuggling and cockfighting activities of the Hawkhurst Gang. It is in the civil parish of Cranbrook and Sissinghurst.

The nearest railway station is at Staplehurst.

Geography
Sissinghurst is situated with Cranbrook to the south, Goudhurst to the west, Tenterden to the east and Staplehurst to the north. It sits just back from the A229 which goes from Rochester to Hawkhurst.

History
Sissinghurst's history is similar to that of nearby Cranbrook. Iron Age working tools have been found and the village was for centuries a meeting and resting place for people travelling towards the south coast.

Sissinghurst Castle Garden

Sissinghurst's garden was created in the 1930s by Vita Sackville-West, poet and gardening writer, and her husband Harold Nicolson, author and diplomat. Sackville-West was a writer on the fringes of the Bloomsbury group who found her greatest popularity in the weekly columns she contributed as gardening correspondent of The Observer, which incidentally – for she never touted it – made her own garden famous. The garden itself is designed as a series of "rooms", each with a different character of colour and/or theme, divided by high clipped hedges and pink brick walls.

Trinity Church
Sissinghurst's religious activities are served by the Church of England. The church is titled 'Trinity Church' and was built in 1838. It is currently managed by Rev. Pete Deaves who is also Rector of Frittenden.

People
People of note who have lived in Sissinghurst include:
 Sir Richard Baker (ca.1568–1645) a politician, historian and religious writer
 Laurence Drummond (1861–1946) a British Army general officer
 Sir Harold Nicolson (1886–1968)  British diplomat, author and politician
 Vita Sackville-West CH (1892–1962) The Hon Lady Nicolson, English poet, novelist and gardener
 Pamela Schwerdt (1931-2009) joint head gardener at Sissinghurst Castle Garden from 1959 to 1990 and a pioneering horticulturalist
 Christopher Lee (born 1941) a British writer, historian and broadcaster
 Ian Hislop (born 1960) editor of Private Eye and team captain of Have I Got News for You, husband of Victoria Hislop.
 Victoria Hislop (born 1959) novelist and author.

References

External links

 Sissinghurst Village website
 The National Trust website
 Cranbrook website

Villages in Kent